Highway 340 is a highway in the Canadian province of Saskatchewan. It runs from Highway 16 at Radisson to Highway 40 at Hafford.

Highway 340 also intersects Highway 685.

References

340